Karna Bahadur Malla is a Nepali politician. He served as member of the Provincial Assembly of Sudurpashchim Province.

Electoral history

Dadeldhura 1(B)

Reference

Living people
Nepali Congress politicians from Sudurpashchim Province
Year of birth missing (living people)
Members of the Provincial Assembly of Sudurpashchim Province